In Greek mythology, Pelops (/ˈpiːlɒps, ˈpɛlɒps/; Greek: Πέλοψ "dark eyes" or "dark face", derived from pelios 'dark' and ops 'face, eye') may refer to the following three figures:

 Pelops, king of Pisa and son of Tantalus
 Pelops, son of Agamemnon
 Pelops, an Egyptian prince and one of the sons of Aegyptus. He married the Danaid Danais and was killed by her during their wedding night.

Notes

References 

 Apollodorus, The Library with an English Translation by Sir James George Frazer, F.B.A., F.R.S. in 2 Volumes, Cambridge, MA, Harvard University Press; London, William Heinemann Ltd. 1921. ISBN 0-674-99135-4. Online version at the Perseus Digital Library. Greek text available from the same website.
 Gaius Julius Hyginus, Fabulae from The Myths of Hyginus translated and edited by Mary Grant. University of Kansas Publications in Humanistic Studies. Online version at the Topos Text Project.
 Pausanias, Description of Greece with an English Translation by W.H.S. Jones, Litt.D., and H.A. Ormerod, M.A., in 4 Volumes. Cambridge, MA, Harvard University Press; London, William Heinemann Ltd. 1918. . Online version at the Perseus Digital Library
 Pausanias, Graeciae Descriptio. 3 vols. Leipzig, Teubner. 1903.  Greek text available at the Perseus Digital Library.

Egyptian characters in Greek mythology